Dalyr (Dalır) is a rural locality (a selo), the administrative centre of and one of three settlements, in addition to Bychchagdan and Kulusunnakh, in Dalyrsky Rural Okrug of Verkhnevilyuysky District in the Sakha Republic, Russia. Its population as of the 2010 Census was 888, of whom 439 were male and 449 female, up from 840 as recorded during the 2002 Census.

References

Notes

Sources
Official website of the Sakha Republic. Registry of the Administrative-Territorial Divisions of the Sakha Republic. Verkhnevilyuysky District. 

Rural localities in Verkhnevilyuysky District